Aerolíneas de El Salvador or AESA was a Salvadoran airline formed after the merging of TAES and TACA El Salvador, both domestic airlines using Dakota YS-53-C. A small collection of Douglas C-47 and DC-3 were Aerolíneas de El Salvador's main fleet. In 1991, the airline was merged to TACA international.

Airlines of El Salvador

TACA Airlines (Now Avianca El Salvador) is the known flag carrier airline of Central America which has the code IATA that is operating on its own. It took its start in 1931 and has the main hub at El Salvador International Airport. There are three other secondary hubs. Its services are famous all over the world and are serving 50 destinations round the globe. It caters around the 22 countries of the globe. It operates domestically in North and South America along with the Central America and Caribbean, with known destinations in America being Miami, San Francisco, and Washington, D.C. In 2013, TACA Airlines would officially complete its merge with Colombian-based airliner Avianca.

VECA Airlines was a Salvadorean airline owned by Sociedad Hasgar S.A. de C.V. and was El Salvador's flag carrier established in early 2014 in San Salvador. The main airline hub was located in San Salvador at Monseñor Óscar Arnulfo Romero International Airport. It ceased operations on January 18, 2017.

-TAES. Taxi Aéreos de El Salvador or TAES is a Salvadoran airline that operates domestic flights within El Salvador. Taes operates with a fleet of Piper PA-31 Navajos and Piper PA-23 Aztecs. TAES provides flights from San Miguel Airstrip to Ilopango Airport and Comalapa International Airport.

Defunct airlines of El Salvador
Airlines established in 1960
Airlines disestablished in 1991